Embolanthera is a genus of flowering plants belonging to the family Hamamelidaceae.

Its native range is Southern Vietnam, Western Philippines.

Species:

Embolanthera glabrescens 
Embolanthera spicata

References

Hamamelidaceae
Saxifragales genera